Aberdeen F.C. competed in the Scottish Premier Division, Scottish Cup, Scottish League Cup and UEFA Cup in the 1991–92 season.

Overview
After the disappointment of losing the league championship on the final day of the previous season, Aberdeen began with four Premier Division victories. The early promise of the season was ended when the Dons lost at home to Airdrieonians in the League Cup. A few weeks later, co-manager Jocky Scott resigned in order to become manager of Dunfermline, leaving Alex Smith as sole manager.

Following Scott's departure, Aberdeen's season rapidly fell apart. In the UEFA Cup, Aberdeen lost at home and away to Danish club Boldklubben 1903 in the first round. A run of seventeen league games which yielded just three victories between November and February cost manager Alex Smith his job as he became the first Aberdeen manager ever to be sacked, with the club dangerously close to the relegation zone. His successor, club legend Willie Miller, managed to revitalise the team and had them in contention for a UEFA Cup spot until the last day of the season, but a loss to league champions Rangers resulted in Aberdeen missing out on European football for the first time in 15 years. In the Scottish Cup, Aberdeen lost at home in the third round to Rangers. Eoin Jess finished as the top scorer with 12 goals. Major signings included Finnish striker Mixu Paatelainen from Dundee United and Theo ten Caat, who became the fifth Dutch player to join the club in recent years.

Results

Scottish Premier Division

Final standings

Scottish League Cup

Scottish Cup

UEFA Cup

Squad

Appearances and goals

|}

References

External links
AFC Heritage Trust

Aberdeen F.C. seasons
Aberdeen